The 1996–97 Purdue Boilermakers men's basketball team represented Purdue University as a member of the Big Ten Conference during the 1996–97 NCAA Division I men's basketball season. The team was led by Gene Keady and played its home games at Mackey Arena.

Roster

Schedule and results

|-
!colspan=9 style=| Regular Season

|-
!colspan=9 style=| NCAA Tournament

Rankings

References

Purdue
Purdue
Purdue Boilermakers men's basketball seasons
Purd
Purd